Sad Satan was a PC game built with the Terror Engine, first reported on the YouTube channel Obscure Horror Corner on June 25, 2015.

Following initial reviews, the channel's video of the game was picked up by a number of English-language publications and, later, internationally. The creator of the game was allegedly a man from Lubbock, Texas named Gary Graves.

History 
In an interview with Kotaku, the channel's owner, identified as “Jamie”, claimed to have downloaded the game from a Tor hidden service after receiving a tip from an anonymous subscriber. The subscriber in turn claims to have found the link via a deep web internet forum, from a user only known as "ZK". Initially, some followers were skeptical of the game, fearing it may have contained gore or child pornography. However, the owner of Obscure Horror Corner shared that the game had not contained any such material.

Following the Kotaku interview, the subreddit "/r/sadsatan" was formed on Reddit to discuss the game and quickly realized the .onion address provided by Obscure Horror Corner contained invalid characters. Three days later, another interview with the Obscure Horror Corner owner appeared on Kotaku claiming that the link was purposefully given in error, since the game itself did, in fact, contain such graphic material, and the Obscure Horror Corner channel owner did not want to be held responsible for disseminating such material. In an update to the Kotaku article, original interviewer Patricia Hernandez stated:

Minutes before the update, a new version of the game was posted to 4chan by someone claiming to be ZK, claiming that Obscure Horror Corner had not been showing their viewers the "true" Sad Satan. Members of the 4chan community downloaded this version of the game and attempted to play it. Some users complained that their computers began running sluggishly, and a few even reported that their computers became completely unresponsive while trying to run the game. A few users even reported that their computers would not turn on anymore after running this version of the game. One Reddit user attempted to play the game from a Live USB instead of from his computer's main hard drive. Later, when this user tried to boot up his computer, the computer failed to start up normally. This version of the game, dubbed the "clone" by most of the /r/sadsatan community, contained images of violent gore and child pornography, some of which were accessible right from the title screen, resulting in another version of the game with this graphic material removed (which is often called the "clean" version) being created by Redditors and subsequently redistributed. 

In 2017, a man from Lubbock, Texas named Gary Graves was arrested on counts of child pornography possession. He ran a YouTube channel Scarebere which had posted a video titled Sad Sad Satan. The YouTube channel in question can be traced back to a Reddit account that was created 4 days before the post containing the link to the "clone" was posted on 4chan; the Reddit account that was created was ScarebereZK. Another video found on the channel also showed a middle-aged man; the credits in the video identified him as Gary Graves. The man in the video is identical to another Gary found in the 2017 Lubbock criminal registry, which led some to assume that Gary was indeed the creator and poster of the "clone" game.

Speculation 
Sad Satan was the last game covered by Obscure Horror Corner, and since then, the YouTube channel has been abandoned for unknown reasons. There has been speculation that the game was in fact created by the owner of Obscure Horror Corner in an effort to increase viewer subscription count, and that the Deep Web story was fabricated to give the whole account more intrigue. Some believe that Obscure Horror Corner created the clone as well in an attempt to lend credibility to the claim that there was actually gore and child pornography in the game.

It is also possible that Sad Satan was not created by the owner of Obscure Horror Corner, and that in truth, the owner of the channel decided to go into hiding because of all the controversy after the malware version of Sad Satan was released.

Others also speculate that ZK and the owner of Obscure Horror Corner are the same individual. and the onion link is gone.

Content 

The original game posted by Obscure Horror Corner features walking down monochromatic corridors while various audio samples are played and looped over each other. Audio in the game leans heavily on recordings of interviews with various murderers, such as Charles Manson. The game also depends heavily on distorted or reversed audio of such interviews or musical clips, such as the song I love Beijing Tiananmen, played in the beginning. Reversed clips from the Swedish Rhapsody numbers station can also be heard. The Doors' rendition of "Alabama Song" can also be heard, starting with the verse "Show me the way to the next little girl."

While the player controls their character through the hallways, images may intermittently display, taking up the entire screen and preventing the player from progressing any further until the image automatically closes a few seconds later. Most of the images seem to reference child abuse, especially people indicted in Operation Yewtree, such as images of Jimmy Savile and Rolf Harris. Other images revolve around crime, and include people convicted or accused of murder such as Japanese child murderer, cannibal, rapist and necrophile Tsutomu Miyazaki. Included also are photographs of Lady Justice statues, Colombian footballer Andrés Escobar and political figures such as former UK Prime Minister Margaret Thatcher and assassinated US President John F. Kennedy. Works of Roger Ballen and Walter Sanders were also included.

In the "True" version from 4chan, which is a completely different game than the one shown on YouTube, images of accident victims and murder victims are also shown, including the aftermath of a person struck by a truck, and a beheading. Additionally, at least one version of the game contains an image related to the case of Corinne Danielle Motley, a Florida woman who was arrested for producing child pornography, the image being a screencap from a video that led to her arrest.

That particular version also contained a virus that caused a wide range of negative effects, from causing the infected computer to become sluggish to a permanent shutdown, once the executable was run. The only other "characters" in the game are children who simply stand in one place and do not move or interact with the player at all. In the final video posted by Obscure Horror Corner, one of these children does begin to follow the player, causing "contact damage". Since the player has no means of self-defense or any ability to heal damage, the player will inevitably die at this point in the game.

References

External links 
 Sad Satan on Reddit

Dark web
Horror video games
Single-player video games
Windows-only games
Windows games
Urban legends
Indie video games
Obscenity controversies in video games
Child abuse
2015 video games
Internet mysteries
Video games about children
Video games developed in the United States